The Open Villa de Madrid is a tournament for professional female tennis players played on outdoor clay courts. The event is classified as a $80,000+H ITF Women's Circuit tournament and has been held in Madrid, Spain since 2022.

Past finals

Singles

Doubles

External links
 ITF search

ITF Women's World Tennis Tour
Recurring sporting events established in 2022
Clay court tennis tournaments
Tennis tournaments in Spain